Nathaniel DeWayne Vasher (born November 17, 1981) is a former American football cornerback who played seven seasons in the National Football League (NFL). He played college football at Texas and was drafted by the Chicago Bears in the fourth round of the 2004 NFL Draft.

He has also been a member of the San Diego Chargers and Detroit Lions.

Early years
An all-state selection at both cornerback and wide receiver at Texas High School in Texarkana, Texas, Vasher was recruited by the University of Texas at Austin. He started at strong safety for the Longhorns in 2001 and at cornerback in 2002 and 2003. He intercepted 17 passes in his college career, tying the school record. He also returned punts and earned All-America honors as a punt returner in 2001.

Professional career

Chicago Bears
The Chicago Bears selected Vasher in the fourth round of 2004 NFL Draft. He began his career with the team as a back-up cornerback, but became a starter by the fourth week of the season. Vasher became the Bears’ top cornerback after Charles Tillman was sidelined with an injury. In one of his best games of the season, Vasher intercepted one of Ken Dorsey’s passes and returned it for a 71-yard touchdown.

Vasher had the best season of his career in 2005, when he led the Bears and National Football Conference with eight interceptions. He also set a record for the longest return of any kind when he returned Joe Nedney’s missed 52-yard field goal for a 108-yard touchdown. The record was later tied by teammate Devin Hester (who returned a missed Jay Feely field goal for a score on November 12, 2006 against the Giants) and Ellis Hobbs (who returned a kickoff for a touchdown on September 9, 2007 against the Jets). The record is now held by Antonio Cromartie, who returned a missed Ryan Longwell field goal 109 yards for a touchdown for San Diego against Minnesota on November 4, 2007. Vasher completed the season with an invitation to the Pro Bowl, as well as two player of the week awards.

Vasher missed portions of the 2006 season on account of injuries and was limited to only three interceptions. He played a pivotal role in the Bears’ National Football Conference Championship victory by recovering a fumble and also intercepting Drew Brees in the game's final minutes. He was later assigned to cover Marvin Harrison, one of the Indianapolis Colts’ top receivers, and limited him to 59 yards, while also assisting Chris Harris in an interception.

During the subsequent off-season, the Bears re-signed Vasher and Tillman to long-term contracts. He sustained a groin injury during the third game of the 2007 season and was forced to miss the next ten games while recuperating. He made his return during a Monday Night Football match up against the Minnesota Vikings, in which he intercepted a pass and also helped Brian Urlacher record one by delivering a hit to Robert Ferguson. Vasher continued to struggle with injuries, and lost his starting job to Zack Bowman in 2009.

On March 17, 2010, Vasher was released from the Bears.

San Diego Chargers
Vasher signed a two-year contract with the San Diego Chargers on March 29, 2010 but was released in September before playing in a game with the team.

Detroit Lions

On September 13, 2010 Vasher signed with the Detroit Lions. He was re-signed to a one-year deal on March 4, 2011. On September 3, 2011 Vasher was cut by the Lions.

Personal life
Vasher was invited to throw the ceremonial opening pitch, and sing "Take me out to the Ball Game" at Wrigley Field, for the Chicago Cubs vs. Washington Nationals game on May 6, 2007. Vasher was nicknamed "ESPN3" in college, and "The Interceptor" by Bears fans due to his many interceptions.

His nephew, T. J. Vasher, is currently a wide receiver for the Dallas Cowboys.

In 2018, Vasher and former Bears teammate Johnny Knox became assistant coaches at Carmel High School under ex-Bear Blake Annen.

References

External links
Official website
Career statistics
San Diego Chargers bio

1981 births
Living people
Players of American football from Texas
American football cornerbacks
National Conference Pro Bowl players
People from Texarkana, Texas
People from Wichita Falls, Texas
Texas Longhorns football players
Chicago Bears players
San Diego Chargers players
Detroit Lions players